IDRC may refer to:

 International Disaster and Risk Conference
 International Development Research Centre (Canada)
 International Dispute Resolution Centre
 Inclusive Design Research Centre
 International Drag Racing Competition